is a 1955 black-and-white Japanese film directed by Bin Kato.

Cast
 Ichikawa Raizō VIII
 Machiko Mizuhara
 Michiko Ai

References

Japanese black-and-white films
1955 films
Films directed by Bin Kato
Daiei Film films
1950s Japanese films